This is a list of newspapers in Oman.

Al-Shabiba
Alwatan
Azamn
Oman Daily Observer - English
Oman Tribune - English
Muscat Daily - English
TheWeek - published Wednesdays, English
Times of Oman -  English
The Arabian stories - English & Arabic

See also

List of newspapers

References

External links
 

Oman
Newspapers